Presidential elections were held in Portugal on 6 August 1915. Following Portugal's 1911 constitution, the Congress of the Republic must elect the president in Lisbon instead of the Portuguese people.

There were a total of 7 candidates. One of the Democratic Party candidates, Bernardino Machado won against his opponents and he was elected as the new President of Portugal.

Results

References

1915 elections in Europe
1915 elections in Portugal
Presidential elections in Portugal
August 1915 events